Simone Spinola (Genoa, 1497 - Genoa, 3 October 1569) was the 66th Doge of the Republic of Genoa.

Biography 
Born in Genoa in a period around 1497, Simone Spinola was member of the noble Spinola family of the Luccoli branch and adhered to that nobility considered "old" and opposed to the "new" one. A skilled merchant, in Antwerp and in the County of Flanders, he made his fortune while maintaining economic and state relations with Genoa. And in certain years he returned to the Genoese republic where, among other positions, he held the position of consul.

Without ever neglecting his interests in Flanders where he periodically went, he received the position of ambassador to Genoa from the Senate in the papal court of Pope Pius V during 1566.

Returning to the Genoese capital in 1567, Simone Spinola, on October 15 of the same year, was elected by the Grand Council new Doge of the Republic of Genoa, the twenty-first since the biennial reform and the sixty-sixth in republican history.

The benevolent efforts that led to a reconciliation of the relations between the Genoese republic and its colony of Corsica are mentioned in the annals of the main and relevant facts of its stave. He had not yet completed his mandate when, suddenly, Doge Spinola died in Genoa on October 3, 1569. The body was buried in the mausoleum of the chapel of Santa Caterina da Siena inside the no longer existing church of San Domenico.

See also 

 Doge of Genoa
 Republic of Genoa

References 

1497 births
1569 deaths
16th-century Doges of Genoa
Spinola family
People from Genoa